Fuligo is a widespread genus of plasmodial slime mold in the family Physaraceae.  These organisms are protozoans rather than fungi, but for historical reasons are sometimes treated as part of mycology.

Species
The following species are accepted by Species Fungorum:

Fuligo aurea (Penz.) Y. Yamam. (1998)
 Pers. (1796)
Fuligo cinerea (Schwein.) Morgan (1896)
Fuligo flava Pers. (1794)
Fuligo gyrosa E. Jahn (1902)
Fuligo intermedia T.Macbr. (1922)
Fuligo leviderma H. Neubert, Nowotny & K. Baumann (1995)
Fuligo luteonitens L.G. Krieglst. & Nowotny (1995)
Fuligo lycoperdon (Bull.) Schumach. (1803)
Fuligo megaspora Sturgis (1913)
Fuligo muscorum Alb. & Schwein. (1805)
Fuligo ochracea (Peck) Peck (1878)
Fuligo plumbea Schumach. (1803)
Fuligo rufa Pers. (1794)
Fuligo septica (L.) F.H.Wigg (1780)
Fuligo varians Sommerf. (1826)

References

Amoebozoa genera
Physaraceae